Emma Brown (born 18 September 1979) is a retired British Paralympic powerlifter who won gold medals at the 2000 and 2004 Summer Paralympics.

Personal life
Brown was born in Gravesend, Kent, England to Welsh Parents. However, she is Welsh by right and hates articles referring to her being born in England as she only lived there for the first 2 years of her life. She has lived in Wales ever since. Brown is a full-time wheelchair user as she cannot walk as a result of being born with spina bifida. She has also lived in Tonteg, South Wales. She has appeared twice (1999-2000 and again in 2014) on Countdown.

Powerlifting career
Previous to powerlifting Brown participated in other sports such as track and field (especially archery). On one occasion the weather was so atrocious that the teams decided to go in watch some of the indoor sports.  So she decided to have a go at powerlifting at Stoke Mandeville and set a British record with her first lift. Emma has said many times in interviews that she preferred the sport because it was indoors and out of the weather!

At the 2000 Summer Paralympics hosted by Sydney, Australia, she lifted 132.5 kg to win the gold medal in the women's up to 82.5 kg event. As the sport was making its Games debut she became the first British woman to win a Paralympic powerlifting gold medal.

She competed at her second Paralympics at the 2004 Games held in Athens, Greece. She successfully defended her title in the women's up to 82.5 kg competition; she lifted a total of 130 kg, tied with French lifter Carine Burgy, but won the gold medal based on her lower body weight.

In addition to her Paralympic games medals Brown won World Championship gold medals in 1998 and 2002 as well as six European titles in 1995, 1997, 1999, 2001, 2003 and 2005.

Injury forced her to retire from competitive powerlifting in 2007.

References

1979 births
Living people
Powerlifters at the 2000 Summer Paralympics
Powerlifters at the 2004 Summer Paralympics
Medalists at the 2000 Summer Paralympics
Medalists at the 2004 Summer Paralympics
Paralympic gold medalists for Great Britain
Paralympic powerlifters of Great Britain
Female powerlifters
Sportspeople from Gravesend, Kent
People with spina bifida
People with paraplegia
Welsh Paralympic competitors
Paralympic medalists in powerlifting